Francesco Maria de' Medici (12 November 1660 – 3 February 1711) was a member of the House of Medici. He was successively a Governor of Siena, cardinal and later the heir of the duchy of Montefeltro by right of his mother.

Biography 

Medici was born in Florence and was the second son of Ferdinando II de' Medici, Grand Duke of Tuscany and his wife Vittoria della Rovere. He was the product of a reconciliation between his parents after his mother found the Grand Duke of Tuscany in bed with one of his pages. He was the younger brother of the Cosimo de' Medici, Grand Prince of Tuscany. His maternal cousins included the Austrian bishop of Olmütz and the Duke of Mantua.

In 1683 he was appointed to governor of Siena, a position he maintained until his death. Three years later in September 1686 he was created cardinal with the permission of Pope Innocent XI. Francesco Maria exerted a notable influence in the conclaves of 1689 and 1700. Despite having this influence with the Papal States, he lived mainly at Villa di Lappeggi outside Florence. In his tenancy of the villa, Lappeggi was restored and became known as the seat of his personal court where various parties and much revelry took place.

At the death of his mother in March 1694, Medici succeeded to the Duchies of Rovere and Montefeltro, her allodial possessions, once the possession of the House of La Rovere. He acted as mentor to his nephew Grand Prince of Tuscany, heir to the Tuscan throne. When it became clear that the Grand Prince and his wife Violante Beatrice of Bavaria were not going to produce an heir, Cosimo III looked towards his brother to solve the problem facing the Tuscan succession. The question of an heir was further exacerbated when the union between Prince Gian Gastone and Anna Maria of Saxe-Lauenburg also remained barren.

In 1709, when his health had already deteriorated, he obtained the Papal dispensation from the cardinalate, and was forced to marry Eleonora Luisa Gonzaga, daughter of Vincenzo Gonzaga, Duke of Guastalla, in an attempt to save the dynasty. Married by proxy on 16 June 1709, the couple were married in person on 14 July 1709.

Contemporaries agreed that Gonzaga was an attractive woman with beautiful skin, eyes, mouth, and waist. However, it was soon clear that the marriage was not to be a fruitful union. Gonzaga was repulsed by her husband, refusing to fulfil her marital duties with a man twenty-six years her senior. Despite requisitioning the assistance of her old confessor from Guastalla, Cosimo III could not cajole her into submitting, as she allegedly feared contracting venereal diseases. Medici had her surmount this predicament and eventually the marriage was consummated. However, no heirs were born leaving Francesco Maria devastated.

Medici retired to Bagno a Ripoli where he died in 1711 from dropsy, leaving behind exorbitant debts. His wife outlived him till 1742 having gone mad.

Ancestry

References

Bibliography 
 Acton, Harold: The Last Medici, Macmillan, London, 1980, 
 Moroni, Gaetano: Dizionario di Erudizione Storico Ecclesiastica da San Pietro, Tipografia Emiliana, 1847

External links 

1660 births
1711 deaths
Francesco Maria
17th-century Italian nobility
17th-century Italian cardinals
18th-century Italian cardinals
Nobility from Florence
Deaths from edema
Governors of Siena
Francesco Maria de' Medici
Burials at San Lorenzo, Florence
Resigned cardinals
Clergy from Florence
Sons of monarchs